International Boundary US-Canada Monuments are in North Cascades National Park, in the U.S. state of Washington. The monuments were erected along the international border between the U.S. and Canada between the years 1906 and 1907. The original monuments were constructed between 1859 and 1860 but no longer exist. A total of 17 monuments can be found along the northern border of the park.

References

Buildings and structures completed in 1906
Buildings and structures in Whatcom County, Washington
Monuments and memorials on the National Register of Historic Places in Washington (state)
National Register of Historic Places in North Cascades National Park
National Register of Historic Places in Ross Lake National Recreation Area
National Register of Historic Places in Whatcom County, Washington
1906 establishments in Washington (state)